The Buick Rainier is a mid-size luxury SUV that was manufactured by General Motors and marketed by Buick for model years 2004–2007. It was named after Mount Rainier, and — along with the Saab 9-7X — was the replacement for the Oldsmobile Bravada.

History

The Rainier was introduced on July 28, 2003 for the 2004 model year, in a 5-door, 5-passenger configuration, yet was one of only five GMT360 SUVs to offer a V8 engine — along with the GMC Envoy Denali, Isuzu Ascender EXT, Saab 9-7X 5.3i and Aero, and Chevrolet TrailBlazer LT (optional) and SS. Both rear and all-wheel drive models were offered. An upscale CXL trim added a better Bose stereo and XM Satellite Radio. For the 2004 model year only, there was a CXL Plus trim level with a touchscreen navigation system.

Buick also debuted the QuietTuning sound insulation on the Rainier, where a vehicle's sound dampening featured triple door seals, acoustic laminate glass, and thicker sound-absorbing pads on the hood and firewall.

The Rainier was discontinued after the 2007 model year and was replaced by the Buick Enclave in 2008.  GM ended production of the related Chevrolet TrailBlazer, GMC Envoy, and Saab 9-7X after the 2009 model year.  

The Insurance Institute for Highway Safety (IIHS) gave the 2004 Rainier an overall Marginal score for front impacts while the 2005 and newer models are given an Acceptable score.  In side impacts the Rainier was given an overall Marginal score with side airbags present.

Engines 
The Rainier debuted with a standard LL8 4.2 L (256 in³) I6 engine producing , and an optional LM6 5300 5.3 L (323 in³) V8 producing . For 2006, the I6 increased to 291 horsepower.

Trim levels 
The Rainier debuted with two trim levels: CXL and CXL Plus. The CXL Plus trim was removed for 2005.  More upscale appointments were added in 2005 including a wood steering wheel, chrome Buick logo, and new black gauges with chrome rings.

2006 update 
 For 2006, the Rainier was updated with a new front fascia and slightly changed instrument panel.  It added standard StabiliTrak Control System with built-in traction control.

Sales

Recall

In 2012, General Motors had recalled more than 258,000 SUVs in the U.S. and Canada to fix short-circuits in power window and door lock switches that could cause fires. The recall covered Chevrolet TrailBlazer, GMC Envoy, Buick Rainier, Isuzu Ascender, and Saab 9-7X SUVs from the 2006 to the 2007 model years. The SUVs were sold or registered in 20 U.S. states, Washington, D.C., and in Canada, where salt and other chemicals are used to clear roads in the winter.

References

External links

Rainier
Mid-size sport utility vehicles
All-wheel-drive vehicles
Rear-wheel-drive vehicles
Cars introduced in 2003
Motor vehicles manufactured in the United States